The 1951 Utah Redskins football team was an American football team that represented the University of Utah as a member of the Skyline Conference during the 1951 college football season. In their second season under head coach Jack Curtice, the Redskins compiled an overall record of 7–4 with a mark of 4–1 against conference opponents, winning Skyline title.

Schedule

NFL Draft
Utah had two players selected in the 1952 NFL Draft.

References

External links
 Official game program: Montana State at Utah – September 15, 1951

Utah
Utah Utes football seasons
Mountain States Conference football champion seasons
Utah Redskins football